Bearsted railway station serves Bearsted in Kent, England. The station and all trains serving it are operated by Southeastern. It is  down the line from  via Herne Hill.

Inside the station building are staffed and self-service ticket sales and a café. A new footbridge was built on the opposite side of the station from the original in 2011.

History
The goods yard was on the up side. It comprised three sidings, one of which served a goods shed. A 30 cwt-capacity crane was provided. Freight facilities were withdrawn on 7 October 1968. The signal box closed on 14 April 1984. A refuge siding was located on the down side.

Services
All services at Bearsted are operated by Southeastern using  and  EMUs.

The typical off-peak service in trains per hour is:

 1 tph to  via  
 1 tph to 

During the peak hours, the station is served by an additional hourly service between London Victoria and Ashford International, increasing the service to 2 tph in each direction.

References 

Sources

External links

Borough of Maidstone
Railway stations in Kent
DfT Category D stations
Former London, Chatham and Dover Railway stations
Railway stations in Great Britain opened in 1884
Railway stations served by Southeastern
1884 establishments in England